Purnendu Basu is an Indian politician and the former Minister for Agriculture in the Government of West Bengal. He was also an MLA, elected from the Rajarhat Gopalpur constituency in the 2011 and 2016 West Bengal state assembly election. He is currently Chairperson of West Bengal State Council of Technical and Vocational Education for Skill Development.

Career

MLA of Rajarhat Gopalpur
He served as the MLA, elected from the Rajarhat Gopalpur constituency in the 2011 and 2016 West Bengal state assembly election and was succeeded by Aditi Munshi in 2021 election.

Minister of West Bengal 
He served as the Agriculture Minister of West Bengal Government in the First Mamata Banerjee ministry from the years 2014 until 2017, when he was replaced by Asish Banerjee.

He served as Minister of Labour of West Bengal Government in the First Mamata Banerjee ministry between the years 2011 – 2014 and was replaced by Moloy Ghatak.

He also served as Minister for Technical Education, Training & Skill Development of West Bengal Government from 2011-2016 and was replaced by Ashima Patra and again from 2017 – 2021 and was succeeded by Humayun Kabir.

References

External links 
West Bengal Legislative Assembly

State cabinet ministers of West Bengal
Living people
West Bengal MLAs 2011–2016
West Bengal MLAs 2016–2021
People from Gopalpur, Nadia
1953 births
Trinamool Congress politicians from West Bengal